Wong Uk is one of the 41 constituencies in the Sha Tin District in Hong Kong.

The constituency returns one district councillor to the Sha Tin District Council, with an election every four years.

The Wong Uk constituency is loosely based on Wong Uk Village, Belair Gardens and Prince of Wales Hospital in Yuen Chau Kok, Sha Tin, with an estimated population of 17,502.

Councillors represented

Election results

2010s

2000s

1990s

References

Yuen Chau Kok
Constituencies of Hong Kong
Constituencies of Sha Tin District Council
1991 establishments in Hong Kong
Constituencies established in 1991